Austin O'Brien (AOB) is a high school located in the Ottewell community of southeast Edmonton. It has about 1000 students.

Namesake 
Austin O'Brien was named after Sir Austin O'Brien, the superintendent of Edmonton Catholic Schools from 1924 to 1961.

History 
Austin O'Brien was opened in 1963 when Edmonton had 18,000 students in the Catholic system and had 55 schools.

The school's Ukrainian-language program began in 1983, and teaches Ukrainian language arts as well as religious studies.

Notable alumni 
 Johnny Boychuk, New York Islanders (NHL)
 Dustin Cherniawski, CFL football player (Saskatchewan Roughriders)
 Don Davies (1981), Member of Parliament for Vancouver Kingsway, B.C.
 Lydia Dotto, science journalist, author and photographer
 Gordon Hinse, CFL player
 Dexter Janke (Calgary Stampeders)
 Pete Lavorato, Edmonton Eskimos football team (CFL)
 Karrick Martin, curler (multiple Brier appearances)
 Pat McCallum, professional curler (WCT)
 Vikki Moss,  singer (left before obtaining diploma)
 Morris Panych, Canadian Playwright

See also 
Edmonton Catholic School District

References 

High schools in Edmonton
Catholic secondary schools in Alberta
Educational institutions established in 1963
1963 establishments in Alberta
Language schools in Canada
Ukrainian-Canadian culture in Alberta
Spanish language in North America
Multilingualism
French-language education in Canada
Polish-language culture
Ukrainian language
Ukrainian Catholic Church in Canada
Eastern Catholic organizations